Blake Ferguson may refer to:

 Blake Ferguson (rugby league) (born 1990)
 Blake Ferguson (American football) (born 1997)